Michael S. Taylor (born 30 December 1953) is a former Australian rules footballer who played for the Collingwood Football Club in the Victorian Football League (VFL) and for the Norwood Football Club in the South Australian National Football League (SANFL). He also played 13 interstate games for South Australia, which included State of Origin football.

Norwood's Club Champion award, which is given to the Norwood footballer judged best and fairest for the season at senior SANFL level, was renamed in his honour as far back as 2018.

On the 14th of June 2022 Michael was inducted into the AFL hall of fame.

Playing career
Taylor came to Norwood as a 15 year old, from the South-East town of Kingston SE. He first played for the Norwood Colts, coached by Mal Smith. In two stints at Norwood, Taylor won six best and fairest awards, a club record he shares with Walter Scott. Five of them were won before he came to Collingwood, where he was a member of a strong Norwood side which won premierships in 1975 and as captain 1978. The 1978 premiership was his first year as captain and he remained in that role until he joined Collingwood in 1981. He had played as both a defender and centreman while at Norwood and he spent most of his time with Collingwood in defence.

Despite playing just four seasons at Collingwood he managed 92 games, including the 1981 VFL Grand Final which they lost to Carlton. He returned to Norwood in 1985 before retiring two years later after 267 SANFL games.

Taylor also played 22 night series matches for Norwood and four night series matches for Collingwood, giving an overall total of 398 matches in his career.

Coaching career
As a coach Taylor has been in charge of Collingwood's reserves team as well as being an assistant at AFL club Adelaide. In 1996 he became coach of West Adelaide and spent five seasons with the club. His best effort was in 1998 when West Adelaide reached the Preliminary final.

When the South Australian Football Hall of Fame was established in 2002, Taylor was among the inaugural inductees, and was also named as a back pocket in Norwood's official 'Team of the Century'.

References

External links

1953 births
Living people
Australian rules footballers from South Australia
Collingwood Football Club players
Norwood Football Club players
West Adelaide Football Club coaches
South Australian State of Origin players
South Australian Football Hall of Fame inductees